Litchfield High School may refer to: 

Litchfield High School (Gadsden, Alabama)
Litchfield High School (Litchfield, Connecticut)
Litchfield High School (Illinois)
Litchfield Senior High School, Litchfield, Minnesota
Agua Fria High School, Avondale, Arizona, formerly known as Litchfield High School